Bob Hay (born 13 June 1938) is a former  Australian rules footballer who played with St Kilda in the Victorian Football League (VFL).

Early life
Bob Hay was born in Burnie in 1938 to Mr and Mrs Ronald Hay. He grew up in Deloraine and attended the local Area School. As a teenager, he was fortunate that his involvement in a motorcycle accident left him only shaken and not badly injured.

Football career
Hay played with Longford in the NTFA during the mid to late 1950s and was coached by Fred Davies.

He then joined St Kilda in 1960.

Hay was captain-coach of Rutherglen in the Ovens & Murray Football League from 1962 to 1965.

When he returned to Tasmania, Hay played with Launceston in the NTFA during the late 1960s and early 1970s.

Notes

External links 

Living people
1938 births
Australian rules footballers from Tasmania
St Kilda Football Club players
Longford Football Club players
Launceston Football Club players